Peter Alan Care (born 28 April 1953) is an English director of music videos, commercials and film. He has directed music videos for Cabaret Voltaire, R.E.M., Bruce Springsteen, Roy Orbison, Depeche Mode and New Order, amongst others.

Biography 
Care began his directorial career as a film student at the Sheffield School of Art (in the North of England).

Upon graduating, he set up the Sheffield Independent Film Company, with funding from the Arts Council and Channel 4. He wrote, directed and produced numerous documentaries and two short films; one of which, "Johnny Yesno", incorporated a soundtrack by a British Industrial cult band Cabaret Voltaire, which was later released as Johnny Yesno: The Original Soundtrack From the Motion Picture. This led to making several ground-breaking music videos for the band.  One of them, "Sensoria", became the most successful "underground" video of all time.  Voted Best Video of the Year (1985) by LA Times; it enjoyed a seven-month run on MTV and was one of the first three videos to be procured by the New York Museum of Modern Art.

Care later moved into the mainstream, making videos for Killing Joke, Thomas Dolby, ABC, Bananarama, Depeche Mode, Fine Young Cannibals, and Public Image Ltd.

Moving to the USA (with Limelight Films) brought a larger variety of artists:  Robbie Nevil, Simply Red, Paul Carrack, Belinda Carlisle, Anita Baker, and Tina Turner.

In 1992, Care helped form Satellite, a division of Propaganda Films.  There, his video career blossomed, working with New Order, Suzanne Vega, James, Robert Cray, Los Lobos, Tom Petty, Bruce Springsteen and especially R.E.M. With R.E.M. he directed five videos and the concert film Road Movie.

At Satellite, his commercial career also took off.  Clients included Nintendo, Levi's, Lee Jeans, H.I.S. Jeans, Microsoft, Coca-Cola, ESPN, MTV itself, Philips, Southwestern Bell, Saturn, Polaroid, MCI, and MasterCard.

Care's first feature film was The Dangerous Lives of Altar Boys, produced by Jodie Foster's Egg Pictures.  The film, starring Emile Hirsch, Jena Malone and Kieran Culkin, was based on the novel (of the same title) by the late Chris Fuhrman.  Released in 2002, it was voted Best First Feature Film at the Independent Spirit Awards.

In 2002, Care joined the bi-coastal Bob Industries, where he was able to jump right back into the commercial world.  Since that time he has been busy on projects for VW, Discover Card, Ameritrade, Mitsubishi, Southwest Airlines, T-Mobile, Southwestern Bell, and American Express.

In 2004, he re-united with R.E.M. to direct two music videos.  He directed an episode of the HBO Series Six Feet Under (Season Four) and continued to direct commercials – for Allstate, Nikon, Ameritrade, and Toyota. In 2005, Care received a Lifetime Achievement Award for his music videos from the Music Video Production Association.

In 2011, Care released "Johnny Yesno Redux", a DVD project in conjunction with Cabaret Voltaire and Mute Records.

Filmography

Television 
Six Feet Under episode "The Black Forest" (2004)

Film 
 The Dangerous Lives of Altar Boys (2002)
Road Movie (1996) (concert film)
Johnny Yesno (1982) (short film)

Music videos

Awards 
Lifetime Achievement Award for his music videos from the Music Video Production Association (MVPA) in 2005
The Dangerous Lives of Altar Boys won the honor of Best First Feature Film at the 2003 Independent Spirit Awards
Best Cinematography for H.I.S Jeans at the 1996 Clio Awards
International Monitor Awards 1996 – Best Music Video for "It's Good to Be King" by Tom Petty
Six nominations for R.E.M.'s "Man on the Moon" video at the 1993 MTV Video Music Awards

References

External links 
Official website

1953 births
Living people
English music video directors
People from Penzance
Film people from Sheffield
English film directors